This is a technical feature comparison of font editors.

General

Basic general information about font editors: creator, first release date, latest stable version, latest release date and license.

Operating system support 

The table below lists the operating systems on which each font editor can run.

General features 

Below is an overview of general features typical for font editors.

The OpenType cmap table can reference a maximum of 65536 glyphs.

TrueType hinting 

Font editors supporting TrueType hinting can do that either automatically or manually. The availability of these functions and the possibility to debug hinting is indicated in the following table.

See also 
Font editor
Comparison of vector graphics editors

References

External links 
Create your own font with these 14 best tools. Retrieved 2016-08-31.
5 best font editors. Retrieved 2016-08-31.

Font editors
Comparison